refers to Japanese art of the sixteenth and seventeenth centuries influenced by contact with the  or 'Southern barbarians', traders and missionaries from Europe and specifically from Portugal. It is a Sino-Japanese word, Chinese Nánmán, originally referring to the peoples of South Asia and Southeast Asia.  During the Nanban trade period, the word took on a new meaning when it came to designate the Portuguese, who first arrived in 1543, and later other Europeans. The term also refers to paintings which Europeans brought to Japan.

History
Nanban art developed after the first Portuguese ships arrived in Kyushu in 1543. While Christian icons and other objects were produced,  or folding screens are particularly notable, with over 90 pairs surviving to this day. These vibrant paintings depicted foreigners of all colors arriving in Japanese ports and walking in the streets of Japanese inland towns (see figure 1). Another popular subject within Nanban art was the depiction of foreign warriors. Artists of the Kanō school were joined by those of the Tosa school in combining foreign subject matter with Japanese styles of painting. Canons of western art of the period, such as linear perspective and alternative materials and techniques, appear to have had little lasting influence in Japan. Given the persecution and prohibition of Christianity from the end of the sixteenth century and the Tokugawa policy of sakoku, which largely closed Japan to foreign contact from the 1630s, Nanban art declined.

Reverse influence
While Japonism did not develop in the west until after the reopening of Japan in the 1850s and the 1860s, there is evidence of earlier Japanese influence in the art of Colonial Mexico.
This was derived from the trade in Japanese crafts through the Manila Galleons, which traveled between Manila (Philippines) to Acapulco (Mexico) from 1565 to 1815.

Museums with collections of Nanban art
 Kobe City Museum
 Museu Nacional de Arte Antiga
 Museu do Oriente, Lisbon

See also
 Nanban trade
 Kirishitan
 Hasekura Tsunenaga
 Japanese words of Portuguese origin
 Yamato-e
 Nanman

References

bibliography

(en) Alexandra Curvelo, Nanban Folding Screen Masterpieces, Chandeigne, 2015 (978-2-36732-121-9)

(pt) Alexandra Curvelo, Obras-primas dos biombos Nanban, Japão-Portugal século XVII, Chandeigne, 2015

Japanese art
Japan–Portugal relations
History of art in Japan